Military transport aircraft include load-carrying non-combat types such as freight and troop carriers, as well as some other specialised types, used by military forces around the world.



In production 

! Type !! Country !! Class !! Role !! Date !! Payload (t) !! Range (km) !! Notes
|-
| AgustaWestland AW109 || Italy || Rotorcraft ||  ||| 1976 || 0.680 ||| 920 || 
|-
| AgustaWestland AW101/EH-101 || ItalyUnited Kingdom || Rotorcraft ||  ||| 1999 || 5.5 || 833 || 
|-
| AgustaWestland AW139 || Italy || Rotorcraft ||  ||| 2003 || 1.575 ||| 1,250 || 
|-
| AgustaWestland AW149 || Italy || Rotorcraft ||  ||| 2003 ||  ||| 800 || 
|-
| AgustaWestland AW159 Wildcat || Italy || Rotorcraft ||  ||| 2014 || 1.5 || 777 || 
|-
| AgustaWestland CH-149 Cormorant || Italy || Rotorcraft ||  ||| 2000 || 8.5 || 833 || 
|-
| Airbus A330 MRTT || Spain || Jet || Strategic / tanker || 2007 || 45 || 14,800 || 
|-
| Airbus A400M || Spain || Propeller|| Strategic / Tactical || 2009 || 37 || 6,400 || 
|-
| Alenia C-27J Spartan || Italy || Propeller || Tactical || 2008 || 11.5 || 5,926 || 
|-
| Antonov An-72 Coaler || Ukraine || Jet || Tactical || 1977 || 10 || 4,325 || 
|-
| Antonov An-178 || Ukraine || Jet || Tactical || 2015 || 18 || 5,500 || 
|-
| Antonov/Taqnia An-132 || Ukraine/Saudi Arabia || Propeller || Tactical || 2016 || 9.2 || 4,400 || 
|-
| Bell UH-1Y Venom || US || Rotorcraft ||  ||| 2008 || 3 ||  ||| 
|-
| Bell Boeing V-22 Osprey || US || Rotorcraft || Tactical || 1989 || 6.8 || 1,627 || 
|-
| Boeing C-17 Globemaster III || US || Jet || Strategic / Tactical || 1991 || 77.5 || 10,390 || 
|-
| Boeing C-40 Clipper || US || Jet || VIP || 2001 || 18 || 5,600 || 
|-
| Boeing KC-767 || US || Jet || Strategic / tanker || 2005 || 29.5 || 11,830 || 
|-
| Boeing KC-46 Pegasus || US || Jet || Strategic / tanker || 2013 || 29.5 || 11,830 || 
|-
| CASA CN-235 || Spain || Propeller || Tactical || 1983 || 5 || 5,003 || 
|-
| Changhe Z-18 || China || Rotorcraft ||  ||| 2014 || 5 || 1,020 || 
|-
| Embraer KC-390 || Brazil || Jet || Tactical || 2014 || 23 || 5,820 || 
|-
| Eurocopter AS532 Cougar || France || Rotorcraft ||  ||| 1978 || 1.5 || 572 || 
|-
| Eurocopter AS565 Panther || France || Rotorcraft ||  ||| 1986 || 2 || 572 || 
|-
| Eurocopter EC225 Super Puma/Airbus Helicopters H225 || France || Rotorcraft ||  ||| 2004 || 5.5 || 857 || 
|-
| Eurocopter EC725/Airbus Helicopters H225M || France || Rotorcraft ||  ||| 2005 || 5.5 || 857 || 
|-
| Harbin Y-12 || China || Propeller || Tactical / Utility || 1983 ||  ||| 1,340 || 
|-
| Harbin Z-9 || China || Rotorcraft ||  ||| 1994 || 1.5 || 572 || 
|-
| Ilyushin Il-76 Candid || Russia || Jet || Strategic / Tactical || 1971 || 47 || 4,400 || 
|-
| Ilyushin Il-112 || Russia || Propeller || Tactical || 2011 || 5.9 || 5,000 || 
|-
| Kawasaki C-2 || Japan || Jet || Tactical || 2010 || 37.6 || 6,500 || 
|-
| Lockheed Martin C-130J Super Hercules || US || Propeller || Tactical / tanker || 1996 || 19-20 || 3,334 || 
|-
| Mil Mi-8 || Russia || Rotorcraft ||  ||| 1967 || 4 || 610 || 
|-
| Mil Mi-17 || Russia || Rotorcraft ||  ||| 1977 || 4 || 610 || 
|-
| Mil Mi-26 || Russia || Rotorcraft ||  ||| 1977 || 20 || 800 || 
|-
| NHIndustries NH90 || EU || Rotorcraft || || 2007 || 2.5 || 800 ||
|-
| Shaanxi Y-8 || China || Propeller || Tactical || 1974 || 20 || 5,616 || 
|-
| Shaanxi Y-9 || China || Propeller || Tactical || 2008 || 25 || 2,200 || 
|-
| Sikorsky UH-60 Black Hawk || US || Rotorcraft ||  ||| 1979 || 4 || 590 || 
|-
| Xian Y-20 || China || Jet || Strategic / Tactical || 2013 || 66 || 7,800 || 
|-

Out of production 

! Type !! Country !! Class !! Role !! Date !! Payload (t) !! Range (km) !! Notes
|-
| Aeritalia G.222 || Italy || Propeller || Tactical || 1978 || 9 || 1,371 || 
|-
| Aérospatiale SA 321 Super Frelon || France || Rotorcraft ||  ||| 1966 || 5 || 1,020 || 
|-
| Aérospatiale SA 330 Puma || France || Rotorcraft ||  ||| 1968 || 3 (Internal)/4.5(External) ||| 580 || 
|-
| AGO Ao 192 || Germany || Propeller || || 1935 || || 1,360 ||
|-
| Airbus A310 MRTT || Spain || Jet || Strategic / tanker || 2003 || 36 || 6,500 || 
|-
| Airspeed Envoy || UK || Propeller || Tactical ||  1936 ||  || 1,050 || 
|-
| Airspeed Horsa || UK || Glider || Tactical ||  1941 ||  || || 
|-
| Antonov A-7 || USSR || Glider || Tactical || 1941 ||  0.9 || || 
|-
| Antonov An-2 Colt || USSR || Propeller || Tactical || 1947 || 2 || 845 || 
|-
| Antonov An-8 Camp || USSR || Propeller || Tactical || 1958 || 11 || 2,780 || 
|-
| Antonov An-12 Cub || USSR || Propeller || Tactical || 1959 || 20 || 5,700 || 
|-
| Antonov An-14 Clod || USSR || Propeller || Tactical / Utility || 1966 || 7 || 650 || 
|-
| Antonov An-22 Antei || USSR || Propeller || Strategic / Tactical || 1965 || 80 || 5,000 || 
|-
| Antonov An-26 Curl || USSR || Propeller || Tactical || 1969 || 5.5 || 2,550 || 
|-
| Antonov An-28 Cash || USSR|| Propeller || Tactical / Utility || 1986 || 2.5 || 1,500 || 
|-
| Antonov An-32 Cline || USSR || Propeller || Tactical || 1976 || 6.7 || 2,500 || 
|-
| Antonov An-70 || Ukraine || Jet || Strategic / Tactical || 1994 || 47 || 6,600 || 
|-
| Antonov An-124 Ruslan || Ukraine || Jet || Strategic || 1982 || 150 || 5,410 || 
|-
| Arado Ar 232 || Germany || Propeller || Tactical || 1943 || 4.5 || 1,062 || 
|-
| Armstrong Whitworth Argosy || UK || Propeller || Strategic / Tactical || 1960 || 13 || 5,552 || 
|-
| Armstrong Whitworth Albemarle || UK || Propeller || Tactical || 1943 || 2 || 2,100 || 
|-
| Armstrong Whitworth Awana || UK || Propeller || Strategic || 1923 ||  || 580 || Prototype
|-
| Atlas Oryx || South Africa || Rotorcraft ||  ||| 1987 ||  ||| 303 || 
|-
| Avro Andover || UK || Propeller || Strategic || 1924 ||  || 740 || 
|-
| Avro York || UK || Propeller || Strategic / Tactical || 1944 || 9.1 || 4,800 || 
|-
| BAe 146 || UK || Jet || Strategic / Tactical ||  1981 || || ||
|- 
| Beechcraft C-12 Huron || US || Propeller || Tactical / Utility || 1974 || 2.1 || 2,900 || 
|-
| Bell UH-1 Iroquois || US || Rotorcraft ||  ||| 1959 || 1.7 || 507 || 
|-
| Bell UH-1N Twin Huey || US || Rotorcraft ||  ||| 1970 ||  ||| 460 || 
|-
| Bloch MB.220 || France || Propeller || Tactical || 1939 ||  ||  1,400 || 
|-
| Blackburn Beverley || UK || Propeller || Strategic / Tactical || 1955 || 20 || 2,000 || 
|-
| Blohm & Voss BV 144 || Germany || Propeller || || 1944 || || 1,550 ||
|-
| Blohm & Voss BV 222 Wiking|| Germany || Propeller || || 1940 || || 6,100 || Flying boat
|-
| Blohm & Voss Ha 139 || Germany || Propeller || || 1936 || || 4,600 || Prototype
|-
| Boeing C-73 || US || Propeller || Strategic / Tactical || 1942 ||  ||| 1,200 || 
|-
| Boeing C-75 Stratoliner || US || Propeller || Strategic / VIP || 1942 || 3.6 || 2,820 || 
|-
| Boeing C-108 Flying Fortress || US || Propeller || Strategic / Tactical || 1943 || 5 || 3,219 || Prototype
|-
| Boeing C-97 Stratofreighter || US || Propeller || Strategic / tanker || 1951 || 9.1 || 6,920 || 
|-
| Boeing YC-14 || US || Jet || Tactical || 1976 || 31.4 || 5,136 || Prototype
|-
| Boeing Vertol CH-46 Sea Knight || US || Rotorcraft ||  ||| 1964 || 2.2 || 1,020 || 
|-
| Boeing Vertol CH-47 Chinook || US || Rotorcraft ||  ||| 1962 || 11 || 370 || 
|-
| Bristol Bombay || UK || Propeller || Tactical || 1935 || 7 || 1,416 || Dual purpose bomber/transport
|-
| Bristol Freighter || UK || Propeller || Strategic || 1945 || 7.3 (Mk31) || 1,320 ||
|-
| Britten-Norman BN-2 Islander || UK || Propeller || Tactical / Utility || 1965 || 2 || 1,400 || 
|-
| Canadair North Star || Canada || Propeller || Strategic / Tactical || 1946 || 5 || 6,212 || 
|-
| Canadair CL-44/CC-106 Yukon || Canada || Propeller || Strategic / Tactical || 1960 ||  ||| 8,990 || 
|-
| Canadair CC-109 Cosmopolitan || Canada || Propeller || Tactical || 1960 || 6.4 || 3,660 || 
|-
| Caproni Ca.122 || Italy || Propeller || Tactical || 1934 ||  ||  1,500 || 
|-
| Caproni Ca.133 || Italy || Propeller || Tactical || 1935 ||  ||  1,350 || 
|-
| CASA C-212 Aviocar || IndonesiaSpain || Propeller || Tactical / Utility || 1971 || 2.8 || 1,433 || 
|-
| Changhe Z-8 || China || Rotorcraft ||  ||| 1994 || 5 || 1,020 || 
|-
| Consolidated C-87 Liberator Express || US || Propeller || Strategic / Tactical || 1942 || 4.5 || 5,311 || 
|-
| Consolidated R2Y || US || Propeller || Strategic / Tactical || 1944 || 5.5 || 6,400 || Prototype
|-
| Convair XC-99 || US || Propeller || Strategic || 1949 || 45 || 13,041 || Prototype
|-
| Convair C-131 Samaritan || US || Propeller || Tactical || 1950 ||  ||| 750 || 
|-
| Curtiss C-46 Commando || US || Propeller || Strategic / Tactical || 1941 || 6.8 || 5,069 || 
|-
| Curtiss C-76 Caravan || US || Propeller || Tactical || 1943 || 3.6 || 1,210 || 
|-
| de Havilland Devon || UK || Propeller || VIP ||  1936 || 1 || 1,420 || 
|-
| de Havilland Heron || UK || Propeller || VIP ||  1950 ||  || 1,473 || 
|-
| de Havilland Canada DHC-4 Caribou || Canada || Propeller || Tactical || 1958 || 3.6 || 2,103 || 
|-
| de Havilland Canada DHC-5 Buffalo || Canada || Propeller || Tactical || 1965 || 8.2 || 1,112 || 
|-
| de Havilland Canada DHC-6 Twin Otter || Canada || Propeller || Tactical / Utility || 1966 ||  ||| 1,434 || 
|-
| DFS 230 || Germany || Glider || Tactical || 1937 || || ||
|-
| DFS 331|| Germany || Glider || Tactical || 1940 || 2.3|| || Prototype
|-
| Dornier Do 19 || Germany || Propeller || Strategic || 1936 || || 1,600 || 
|-
| Douglas C-1|A || US || Propeller || Tactical || 1926 || 1 ||  620 || 
|-
| Douglas DC-2/C-32 || US || Propeller || Strategic / Tactical || 1937 ||  ||| 1,750 || 
|-
| Douglas C-47 Skytrain || US || Propeller || Strategic / Tactical || 1941 || 3 || 2,600 || 
|-
| Douglas C-54 Skymaster || US || Propeller || Strategic / Tactical || 1942 ||  ||| 6,400 || 
|-
| Douglas C-74 Globemaster || US || Propeller || Strategic || 1945 || 22 || 5,470 || 
|-
| Douglas C-47 Skytrain/C-117 Skytrain || US || Propeller || Strategic / Tactical || 1951 || 3 || 2,600 || 
|-
| Douglas C-118 Liftmaster || US || Propeller || Strategic / Tactical || 1947 || 12.7 || 6,700 || 
|-
| Douglas C-124 Globemaster II || US || Propeller || Strategic || 1950 || 34 ||| 10,975 || 
|-
| Douglas C-133 Cargomaster || US || Propeller || Strategic || 1956 || 53.5 || 6,590 || 
|-
| EADS CASA C-295 || Spain || Propeller || Tactical || 1998 || 9.3 || 5,400 || 
|-
| Eurocopter AS365 Dauphin || France || Rotorcraft ||  ||| 1978 || 1.5 || 572 || 
|-
| Fairchild C-82 Packet || US || Propeller || Tactical || 1944 || 12.5 || 6,239 || 
|-
| Fairchild C-119 Flying Boxcar || US || Propeller || Tactical || 1949 || 12.5 || 2,849 || 
|-
| Fairchild C-123 Provider || US || Propeller || Tactical || 1949 || 11 || 1,666 ||
|-
| Fairey Gannet COD.4|| UK || Propeller || Carrier Onboard Delivery||  1949 || || ||
|-
| Focke-Achgelis Fa 223 Drache || Germany || Rotorcraft || Tactical || 1940 || || 700 || 
|-
| Focke-Achgelis Fa 225 || Germany || Rotorcraft || Tactical || 1943 ||  || ||  Prototype
|-
| Focke-Wulf Fw 200 Condor || Germany || Propeller || Strategic / Tactical || 1937 ||  ||| 3,560 || 
|-
| Fokker F27 Friendship || Netherlands || Propeller || Tactical || 1958 ||  ||| 2,055 || 
|-
| Fokker 50 || Netherlands || Propeller || Tactical || 1985 ||  ||| 1,666 || 
|-
| Fokker Y1C || US || Propeller || Tactical || 1931 ||  ||  1,100 || 
|-
| General Aircraft Hamilcar || UK || Glider || Tactical || 1942 || 7|| || 
|-
| General Aircraft Hotspur || UK || Glider || Tactical ||  1940 || || ||
|-
| Gotha Go 146 || Germany || Propeller || || 1936 || || 1,000 || 
|-
| Gotha Go 242 || Germany || Glider || || 1941 || 4 || ||
|-
| Gotha Go 244 || Germany || Propeller || || 1941 ||  || 600||
|-
| Gotha Go 345 || Germany || Glider || || 1944 ||  4.5 || || Prototype 
|-
| Gotha Ka 430 || Germany || Glider || || 1943 ||  1.7 || || Prototype
|-
| Grumman C-1 Trader || US || Propeller || Carrier Onboard Delivery || 1952 || 1.6 || 2,092 || 
|-
| Grumman C-2 Greyhound || US || Propeller || Carrier Onboard Delivery || 1964 || 4.5 || 2,400 || 
|-
| Handley Page Clive| || UK || Propeller || Strategic || 1931 ||  ||  1,240 || 
|-
| Handley Page Hastings || UK || Propeller || Strategic / Tactical || 1948 || 9 || 2,720 || 
|-
| Handley Page H.P.51 || UK || Propeller || Strategic || 1935 ||  ||  1,530 || 
|-
| Hawker Siddeley Andover || UK || Propeller|| Strategic / Tactical|| 1963 || 6.5 || 2,295 ||
|-
| Heinkel He 70 || Germany || Propeller || ||1932 ||  || 1,820 || 
|-
| IAR 330 || Romania || Rotorcraft ||  ||| 1975 ||  ||| 572 || 
|-
| Ilyushin Il-12 Coach || Russia || Propeller || Tactical || 1946 ||  ||| 1,500 || 
|-
| Ilyushin Il-14 Crate || Russia || Propeller || Tactical || 1954 ||  ||| 1,300 || 
|-
| Ilyushin Il-18 Coot || USSR || Propeller || || 1957 || || 6,500 ||
|-
| Ilyushin Il-276 || Russia || Jet || Tactical || 2025 (planned) || 20 || 2,000 || 
|-
| Junkers Ju 52 || Germany || Propeller || Strategic / Tactical || 1930 || 2 || 800 || 
|-
| Junkers Ju 89 || Germany || Propeller || Strategic / Tactical || 1938 || 1.5 || 2,980 || Prototype
|-
| Junkers Ju 90 || Germany || Propeller || Strategic / Tactical || 1937 ||  ||| 1,247 || 
|-
| Junkers Ju 252 || Germany || Propeller || Strategic / Tactical || 1942 || || 3,981 || 
|-
| Junkers Ju 290 || Germany || Propeller || Strategic / Tactical || 1942 || 3 || 6,150 || 
|-
| Junkers Ju 322 || Germany || Glider || || 1941 ||  20 || ||  Prototype
|-
| Junkers Ju 352 || Germany || Propeller || Strategic / Tactical || 1943 || || 1,800 || 
|-
| Junkers Ju 390 || Germany || Propeller || Strategic || 1943 ||  || 9,700 || Prototype
|-
| Junkers W 34 || Germany || Propeller || Tactical || 1926 ||  ||  900 || 
|-
| Kawasaki Ki-56 || Japan || Propeller || Strategic / Tactical || 1940 ||  ||| 3,300 || 
|-
| Kawasaki C-1 || Japan || Jet || Tactical || 1970 || 11.9 || 1,300 || 
|-
| Lisunov Li-2 || USSR || Propeller || Strategic / Tactical || 1939 || 3 || 2,600 || 
|-
| Lockheed Model 18 Lodestar || US || Propeller || Strategic / Tactical || 1940 ||  ||| 4,025 || 
|-
| Lockheed C-69 Constellation || US || Propeller || Strategic / Tactical || 1943 ||  ||| 3,900 || 
|-
| Lockheed C-121 Constellation || US || Propeller || Strategic / Tactical || 1948 ||  ||| 4,445 || 
|-
| Lockheed R6V Constitution || US || Propeller || Strategic || 1946 ||  ||| 8,670 || Prototype
|-
| Lockheed C-130 Hercules || US || Propeller || Tactical / tanker || 1954 || 20.4 || 3,800 || 
|-
| Lockheed C-141 Starlifter || US || Jet || Strategic / Tactical || 1963 || 28.4 || 9,880 || 
|-
| Lockheed C-5 Galaxy || US || Jet || Strategic || 1968 || 122 || 4,445 || 
|-
| Lockheed TriStar (RAF) || US || Jet || Strategic / tanker || 1984 ||  ||| 7,785 || 
|-
| McDonnell Douglas C-9 || US || Jet || Strategic || 1968 ||  ||| 4,700 || 
|-
| McDonnell Douglas YC-15 || US || Jet || Tactical || 1975 || 35 || 4,810 || Prototype
|-
| McDonnell Douglas KC-10 Extender || US || Jet || Strategic / tanker || 1980 || 77 || 18,507 || 
|-
| Messerschmitt Me 321 || Germany || Glider || Strategic / Tactical || 1941 || 20 || ||
|-
| Messerschmitt Me 323 || Germany || Propeller || Strategic / Tactical || 1943 || 10 || 800 || 
|-
| Mil Mi-4 Hound || USSR || Rotorcraft || Tactical || 1952 || 1.6 || 500 ||
|-
| Mil Mi-6 Hook || USSR || Rotorcraft || || 1957 || 12 (internal), 8 (external) || 970 ||
|-
| Mitsubishi Ki-57 || Japan || Propeller || Strategic / Tactical || 1942 ||  ||| 3,000 || 
|-
| Mitsubish MC-20 || Japan || Propeller || Strategic || 1944 ||  ||| 2,700 || 
|-
| Myasishchev VM-T || USSR || Jet || Strategic || 1981 || 45 || 3,565 || 
|-
| Nakajima Ki-34 || Japan || Propeller || Strategic / Tactical || 1937 ||  ||| 1,200 || 
|-
| Nanchang Y-5|| China || Propeller || Tactical / Utility || 1957 || 1,500 || 300 ||
|-
| Percival Pembroke || UK || Propeller || Communications / Utility || 1952 || || 1,660 || 
|-
| Piasecki H-16 Transporter || US || Rotorcraft || || 1953 || || 348 || Prototype
|-
| Piasecki H-21 || US || Rotorcraft || || 1952 || || 427 || 
|-
| PZL M-28 Skytruck || Poland || Propeller || Tactical / Utility || 1993 || 2.5 || 1,500 || 
|-
| Nord Noratlas || France || Propeller || Tactical || 1953 || 12.5 || 2,500 || 
|-
| Savoia-Marchetti SM.81 || Italy || Propeller || Strategic / Tactical || 1935 || 2 || 1,500 || 
|-
| Scottish Aviation Pioneer || UK || Propeller || Tactical || 1947 || || 680 ||
|-
| Scottish Aviation Twin Pioneer || UK || Propeller || Tactical || 1955 || 2 || 1,287 ||
|-
| Short Belfast || UK || Propeller || Strategic || 1964 || 55 || 8,528 || 
|-
| Short Skyvan || UK || Propeller || Tactical / Utility || 1963 || 5 || 1,117 || 
|-
| Short C-23 Sherpa || UK || Propeller || Tactical / Utility || 1982 || 3.2 || 1,239 || 
|-
| Showa/Nakajima L2D || Japan || Propeller || Strategic / Tactical || 1939 || 3 || 2,600 || 
|-
| Siebel Fh 104  || Germany || Propeller || || 1937 || || 1,000 ||
|-
| Sikorsky CH-37 Mojave || US || Rotorcraft ||  ||| 1956 || 3 || 233 || 
|-
| Sikorsky CH-53 Sea Stallion || US || Rotorcraft ||  ||| 1966 || 3.6 || 1,000 || 
|-
| Sikorsky CH-54 Tarhe || US || Rotorcraft ||  ||| 1962 || 9.1 || 370 || 
|-
| Slingsby Hengist || UK || Glider || Tactical || 1942 || || || 
|-
| Sud-Ouest Bretagne || France || Propeller || Strategic || 1946 ||  || 2,175 || 
|-
| Transall C-160 || France/Germany || Propeller || Tactical || 1963 || 16 || 8,230 || 
|-
| Vickers Valentia| || UK || Propeller || Strategic || 1934 ||  ||  1,300 || 
|-
| Vickers Valetta || UK || Propeller || Strategic / Tactical || 1948 || 3 || 2,350 || 
|-
| Vickers VC-10 || UK || Jet || Strategic / Tanker || 1962 ||  || ||
|-
| Vickers Vernon || UK || Propeller || Strategic || 1921 ||  || 510 || 
|-
| Vickers Victoria || UK || Propeller || Strategic || 1926 ||  ||  1,240 || 
|-
| Vickers Warwick C Mk III| || UK || Propeller || Strategic || 1944 || 4.3 || 3,700|| 
|-
| Waco CG-4A || US || Glider || Tactical || 1942 ||  1.9 || || 
|-
| Westland Lynx || UK || Rotorcraft ||  ||| 1978 || 1.5 || 528 ||
|-
| Westland Sea King  / Commando || UK || Rotorcraft || Tactical || 1969 || || 1,230|| 
|-
| Yakovlev Yak-24 || USSR || Rotorcraft || || 1952 || 3.5 || 165 ||
|-
| Yakovlev Yak-100 || USSR || Rotorcraft || Tactical || 1948 || || 325 ||
|-

Retired

See also
 Cargo aircraft
 Military transport aircraft
 List of Aircraft

References

List
Transport
Military transport